Swath or Swathe may refer to:
 Swathe, the strip of mown crop left behind the mower
 A windrow (synonym), a line or row of cut cropusually of hay, or strawleft on a field after mowing/reaping/harvesting, or formed afterwards
 Swath width, the strip of the Earth's surface from which geographic data are collected by a moving vehicle
 SWATH-MS (Sequential Windowed Acquisition of All Theoretical Fragment Ion Mass Spectra), an acquisition type in mass spectrometry
 Small-waterplane-area twin hull (SWATH), a type of ship design
Snow White and the Huntsman, a dark fantasy action-adventure film based on the German fairy tale by the Brothers Grimm